Julio Fierro may refer to:
 Julio Ricardo Fierro, Mexican archer
 Julio Fierro (footballer), Chilean footballer